Olivier Bellisi (born 25 November 1975) is a French former professional footballer who played as a defender. He began his career with Olympique Lyonnais, where he made seven league appearances in three seasons. After a season on loan with Caen, he joined the club permanently in 1999. Bellisi was again sent out on loan during the 2000–01 season, to Louhans-Cuiseaux. Following his release by Caen in 2002, he moved into semi-professional football.

Football career

Olympique Lyonnais
Bellisi started his career at Ligue 1 side Olympique Lyonnais, and was promoted from the youth team to the senior squad in 1995. He made his first-team debut in the 1–2 defeat away at Montpellier on 1 December 1995. Bellisi was named in the squad for the following match against Le Havre, in which he came on as a substitute for Florent Laville in the 63rd minute. In the 1996–97 season, he again made only sporadic appearances, playing three league matches for Lyon including the 1–0 win away at Metz on 26 March 1997. Bellisi was restricted to one substitute appearance in the 1997–98 season. His final match for Lyon came on 25 September 1997 when replaced Alain Caveglia in the 1–3 home defeat to Lens.

Caen and Louhans-Cuiseaux
In the 1998–99 season, Bellisi was sent out on loan to Ligue 2 club Caen. He made his debut for the club on 15 August 1998 in the 1–1 draw with Saint-Étienne. Two weeks later, Bellisi scored the first and only league goal of his career when he netted the opening goal in Caen's 2–0 win against Nice. During his loan spell at Caen, he played a total of 18 league matches and in June 1999, he completed a permanent move from Lyon. He played three matches in the 1999–2000 season, and spent the following campaign out on loan at CS Louhans-Cuiseaux in the Championnat National. Bellisi made 26 league appearances and played one game in the Coupe de France for Louhans-Cuiseaux before returning to Caen in the summer of 2001. In the 2001–02 season he played 20 games for Caen, but was released at the end of the campaign.

Later career
Upon his release by Caen, Bellisi did not find another professional club and joined Championnat de France amateur 2 side AS Lyon Duchère. He spent two seasons with the club before transferring to UF Mâcon, where he ended his career a year later.

References

External links
 

1975 births
Living people
Sportspeople from Lyon Metropolis
French footballers
Association football defenders
Olympique Lyonnais players
Stade Malherbe Caen players
Louhans-Cuiseaux FC players
Lyon La Duchère players
Ligue 1 players
Footballers from Auvergne-Rhône-Alpes